Remigius Adrianus Haanen or Remigius (Remy) van Haanen, (January 5, 1812, Oosterhout - August 13, 1894, Bad Aussee) was a 19th-century painter from the Northern Netherlands. He was the son of the papercutter Casparis Haanen and was the brother of the painters George Gillis Haanen, Elisabeth Alida Haanen and Adriana Johanna Haanen. After learning his trade from his father and at the Academy of Utrecht, he moved in 1837 from the Netherlands to Austria, where he was active in Vienna.

Public Collections
 Museum of Foreign Art, Riga
 Rijksmuseum Amsterdam

Gallery

References	

	
Remigius Adrianus Haanen on Artnet

1812 births
1894 deaths
19th-century Dutch painters
Dutch male painters
People from Oosterhout
19th-century Dutch male artists